Slaný or Slany  (feminine form Slaná or Slana ) is a Czech and Slovak surname. It is derived from the Czech–Slovak word slaný for "salty." It may be a metonymic occupational name for a producer or seller of salt or an habitational name for a person from the Czech settlement called Slaný. Notable people with the name include:

 Bedřich Slaný (born 1932), Czech athlete
 Hans Erich Slany (1926–2013), German designer
 John Slany (died 1632), English merchant and ship builder
  (1907–1989), Czech esperantist

See also 
 Slane (disambiguation)
 Slaney
 Slaný, Czech town (Central Bohemian Region)

References 

Czech-language surnames
Slovak-language surnames
Occupational surnames
Toponymic surnames